Tai Hang Hau is a village in Sai Kung District, New Territories, Hong Kong.

Administration
Tai Hang Hau is a recognized village under the New Territories Small House Policy.

See also
 Sheung Sze Wan

References

Further reading

External links

 Delineation of area of existing village Tai Hang Hau (Hang Hau) for election of resident representative (2019 to 2022)
 Antiquities Advisory Board. Historic Building Appraisal. Leung Ancestral Hall, Nos. 21 & 32 Tai Hang Hau Pictures

 

Villages in Sai Kung District, Hong Kong
Clear Water Bay Peninsula